Ritual Ceremonies of the Imperial Palace describes various Rituals related to the Emperor (the Emperor and the Imperial Family). Of these, ceremonies related to the Emperor can be divided into two categories: national acts as stipulated in Article 7 of the Japanese Constitution, and official acts that do not fall under this category.

Pregnancy-Birth

Gochaku obi 
A ceremony held on the day of the dog, the ninth month of pregnancy, for female members of the Imperial Family who have conceived a child, to pray for a safe delivery. In the case of Empress Masako, the Emperor presented her with a red and white silk sash, which was then delivered to the expectant female royal family member by a palace official sent by the sash's parent, followed by a Gochaku Shinken no Gi. Sanctuaries|Three Palaces]], and takes it back to the Palace to worship on behalf of the couple. The sash is then taken by the head priest to the Three Palace Sanctuaries for substitute worship. The obi is offered to the temple at the end of each of the three halls, and a prayer of congratulations is said. This series of ceremonies is called Kashikokoro Kourei-den Shin-den ni Chakutai Hokoku no Gi. After the ceremony, the sash is delivered again by the attendant, and the crown prince in his morning clothes ties the sash on the queen, who is dressed in daily daily daily cloth and Hakama, with the help of the attendant. In addition, in the fifth month of pregnancy, an internal dressing is performed. But it is not a formal ceremony. In the case of the Crown Princess, she wears a very light indigo daily cloth and a bright scarlet Hakama, and the Chief of the Household of the Crown Prince carries the Obi presented by the Empress into the room. The Crown Prince, dressed in a morning gown and led by a maid of honor, enters, and the couple sits in chairs facing each other. The maid of honor places the obi over the queen's hakama and makes a loose bow knot in front, which the queen herself ties. After the couple leaves and the ceremony is complete, a member of the Togu staff dressed in formal mourning attire says a few words of congratulations, and then the Director General of the Imperial Household Agency delivers the "Onshukushi. The couple will have lunch at the Imperial Palace in the afternoon and report to the Emperor and Empress.

Gifted Sword Ceremony
A ceremony in which a child is born into the imperial family and the emperor gives the child a guardian sword for the purpose of protecting the child in the hope that the child will grow up healthy. The kotatana is wrapped in red brocade with a white wooden scabbard and placed in a paulownia box with the Emperor's crest, and entrusted to a messenger (imperial envoy) who receives the Emperor's wishes at the palace. In modern times, the Imperial Sword is subject to the Muzzle Act.

Ritual of Spore Burial 
A jar containing Placentas is buried in the ground. This was done at least until the birth of Takako Kiyomiya.

Bathing ceremony 
This ceremony is held on the seventh day of the child's birth. The room is divided into two parts, and in one part, a maid gives the child a bath. In the other room, a tokusho yaku wearing a robe and cape recites a classical text (usually from the Nihon Shoki), while a meigen yaku draws a bowstring with a shout. Depending on the situation, the bathing may only be imitated.

Naming Ceremony 
This ceremony is held on the seventh day of the child's birth. The name of the child is written with a brush on a piece of Odakadan-gami paper, and a piece of Japanese paper on which the child's personal seal is written is placed in a paulownia box and placed at the child's bedside. The day after this ceremony, the child's name is recorded in the Imperial Records as an official member of the Imperial Family. This is the "Oshichiya" in general.

Sanden Hokokunogi 
At the same time and day as the naming ceremony, a worshiper announces the birth and naming of a child to Miyanaka Sanden.

Rite of visiting the Palace Sanctuaries (kashikodokoro-koureiden-shinden ni essuru no gi) 
This is a Shinto ceremony in which a newborn child, joined by his or her parents, makes the first visit to the Three Palace Sanctuaries, starting at the Kashikodokoro, then the Koureiden, and lastly the Shinden, for the first time on the 50th day after birth. This is similar to Miyamairi, a traditional Shinto rite of passage in Japan for newborns.

The Ceremony of the First Chopsticks
This is a ritual in which red bean porridge is prepared in a new bowl or chopsticks and fed to the child on the 100th–120th day after birth, in hopes that the child will grow up healthy. In reality, however, it is only an imitation of eating. This is called "Okitsuke" in general.

Growth

The ceremony of wearing hakama
When a child is five years old, he or she wears the hakama that was given to him or her during the ceremony of the Presentation of the Sword.  Boys wore white silk hakama on top of "Ochitakizu no Gofuku", a kimono decorated with a waterfall design, while girls wore dark reddish-purple kosode and hakama of the same color.

Fukasogi no Gi 
The ceremony is held following the Kimono Ceremony. In addition to the kimono and hakama worn in the ceremony, a child's kimono is worn in a separate room. The child stands on the board with a pine tree and a small branch of mountain tachibana, and after cutting the child's hair a little, the child jumps down with a shout.。
 Originally, the ceremony was independent of the Kimono ceremony, but by the early modern period, it was performed simultaneously. The ceremony was held for the first time in 41 years, after 1970 for Fumihito Reimiya, and in 2011 for His Imperial Highness. This was the first time in 41 years. This is the first time in 41 years that the Fukasogi Ritual has been performed for the female members of the Imperial Family (the four Inner Princes and five Queens), so at least in the modern era, it is a ceremony performed only for the male members of the Imperial Family.
After the completion of the Ceremony of the Hakama and the Fukasogi Ritual, the three halls of the Imperial Palace are visited.

Adulthood Ceremony
The Imperial Household Law states that the age of majority for the Emperor, Crown Prince, and Grandchildren is 18 (Article 22). In the Imperial Household Law, the age of majority for the Emperor, Crown Prince, and Grandchildren is 18 (Article 22), and there are no age regulations for other members of the Imperial Family. However, according to the Civil code, the ceremony is held when the person turns 20.

The Rite of Crowning 
 At the home of a male member of the Imperial Family who has reached the age of majority, the male member of the Imperial Family receives a crown from a messenger sent by the Emperor.

Crowning Ceremony
 A male member of the Imperial Family who has reached the age of majority wears a white silk hakama over Keteki-no-hou, the costume of a minor, and holds a Scepter in his hand. On his head, he wears a kuuchi kokusaku, the headgear of a minor, and is led by a leader into the hall of the Tokyo Imperial Palace where the Emperor, Empress, and attendees are waiting. The crowning officer then removes the black belt and puts on a crown with a swallow-tailed tail, attaches a hanging cord to the crown, ties it at the chin, and cuts off both ends of the cord.
The crown is then tied at the chin, and the ends of the cord are cut off. Then, a male member of the Imperial Family who has reached the age of majority steps before the Emperor and Empress to express his gratitude and resolve. The ceremony ends with a word of thanks to his parents as well.
 After this, the adult male members of the Imperial Family change into their adult attire of Sueki-no-Hao and a crown with a hanging tail, and visit the three halls of the palace.

Asami no Ritual
 A ceremony in which a person meets the Emperor and Empress for the first time after reaching the age of majority. The ceremony is held in Western attire. The ceremony ends with the sipping of the nine-year-old wine in turn and the eating of the ritual food with chopsticks.
 After this, Orders, decorations, and medals of Japan are given according to rank, and the coming-of-age ceremony ends. A short time after the ceremony, people visit mausoleums and shrines to report on their coming of age.

Marriage 

The emperor's marriage is called a big wedding in the old Imperial Family Order, but as of 2019, it has never taken place, as no one has married since 1910, when this was established, after he ascended the throne.

"Nousai-no-gi" 
This is a ceremony to mark the end of a marriage.。The male side does it to the female side.

Rite of bestowal of medals and swords
This is a rite of bestowing medals and swords.
This ceremony takes place after the Rite of Acceptance.

Kokki-no-gi 
 A messenger from the emperor's side informs the woman's side of the marriage date.

Ritual of gift-writing
 A ceremony in which engaged couples present each other with waka poems on the day before marriage.

Judai no Gi 
 On the day of the marriage ceremony, a messenger is sent to the woman's side to welcome her.

The marriage ceremony
The Wedding is a ceremony in which a man and a woman pay their respects to the wise men in the three halls of the palace. It is also known as a wedding ceremony in general.
For more information, see Crown Prince Tokujin and Masako Owada's Marriage Ritual.

Kashikokoro Koreiden Shinden ni Etsuru no Gi 
 Female members of the Imperial Family who are to leave the Imperial Family through marriage do not perform the marriage ceremony in the Imperial Palace, but rather worship at the three halls of the Imperial Palace dressed in Kouchiki clothing and report to their ancestors and the gods that they are getting married. The ceremony is not accompanied by the man to be married.

Chouken-no-gi
 A ceremony in which two people meet the Emperor and Empress for the first time as husband and wife. The men and women of the imperial family express their gratitude and aspirations to the emperor, and after receiving his blessing, they sip nine-year-old sake in turn and exchange a cup to solidify their relationship, chopsticks up on the ceremonial food, and ends.
 The surrendering female members of the Imperial Family meet the Emperor and Empress alone and are similarly blessed, but it is a farewell cup, and subsequent Weddings and other events are held outside the imperial family.
 Nine-year-old sake was originally made with Sake, which had been aged for nine years and turned amber, but after the Meiji era, aged old sake was eliminated and the juice of black beans boiled with sake and Mirin was boiled down.

Kuzen-no-gi
This ceremony is held at home after the couple has returned home. Before the ceremonial meal, the queen and the royal family men, in that order, sip sake and share a cup to seal the marriage. After that, the ritual meal is served with chopsticks, and the ceremony ends.

Mikayo no Mochi no Gi
The Mikayo-no-Mochi-no-Gi is held in the bedroom to pray for the prosperity of one's descendants. Each of the four silver plates (three plates for non-Emperor and Crown Prince) is filled with the number of rice cakes (about the size of a Go stone) of the Queen's age, and the couple eats one from each plate. The rice cakes and plates are placed in an ebony box with mother-of-pearl inlays of Barn swallows and displayed in the bedroom for three days, and on the fourth day, they are buried in a direction that brings good luck.

On the fourth day, it is buried in an auspicious direction.
The Wedding reception is a feast held over several days. A wedding reception in general.

The Rite of Audience at the Shrine

Wedding reception
The couple reports their marriage to the Ise Grand Shrine in Ise, Mie Prefecture.

Enthronement

The Rite of Succession of the Sword and Seal

 Acts of State.

The Ceremony of the Sword and Seal Crossing
The first day of the ceremony was the first day of the Kensho. In other words, at the same time as the First Day of the Sages' Palace Ritual, each male member of the Imperial Family, each Minister of State, the Prime Minister, the  Speaker of the House of Representatives, Speaker of the House of Councillors, and Supreme Court. The Emperor wears his normal dress and is preceded by the Chief of Ceremonies and the Director General of the Imperial Household Agency (Minister of the Imperial Household).

Rites of Asami after Accession
This is an act of state. The new emperor makes a statement for the first time (under the old Imperial Household Law, this was called the "Asami Ceremony after Accession to the Throne". (Under the old Imperial Household Law, it was called the "Post-Joining Ceremony.) The ceremony is held in the main hall (Matsunoma) of the palace, with the emperor in formal attire and the empress in robe décolleté (middle-grade formal attire). For the first time since the accession to the throne, the emperor gives a morning visit to his subjects and presents them with the imperial message. This is followed by the Prime Minister's address (renamed the "Address of the People's Representative" in the 2019 Post-Accession Asami Ceremony).

The Rite of Dedication to the Sages

The first day's ceremony was held immediately after the accession.
The first day's ritual is held immediately after the accession to the throne, and the chief priest performs the Norito at the Three Palace Sanctuaries and the Sages' Palace. The rituals of the second and third days are similar, but the ritual of the Imperial Bell and the performance of the Imperial Confession are not performed.

The ceremony of vassalage 

The ceremony of descent to the vassalage before the Emperor, Empress and Dowager Empress.
 The imperial family members who are to descend to the vassalage attend the imperial palace and make their speeches before the Emperor and Empress, receiving the imperial message from the Emperor and the I-sensei from the Empress. The emperor and empress then present the imperial message and the I-i, respectively.

References

Works cited 
 
 
 昭和天皇の崩御に伴う主な儀式・行事一覧
 天皇陛下の即位に伴う主な儀式・行事一覧

Shinto festivals
Japanese Imperial Rituals